The lieutenant governor of South Carolina is the second-in-command to the governor of South Carolina. This is a list of lieutenant governors of the U.S. state of South Carolina, 1730 to present.

Royal period (1719–1776)
The lieutenant governor position was created by the British government under the control of the Board of Trade in 1729 for a term beginning on January 1, 1730. Prior to that, the Governor appointed a deputy governor to act in his stead during his absence. There were only three lieutenant governors during the Royal period and two were father and son.

Statehood period (1776–present)

Vice presidents under the Constitution of 1776
The General Assembly chose the vice president for a term of two years.

Parties
 (2)

Lieutenant governors in early and antebellum America
The General Assembly chose the lieutenant governor for a term of two years.

Parties
 (6)
 (5) 
 (16)
 (3)
 (16)

Lieutenant governors post-Civil War through the present
First Constitution of South Carolina to provide for the direct election of the lieutenant governor.
2-year term, 1868-1927, no limit
4-year term, 1927–present, no  limit

Legend:

Notes

See also
Lieutenant Governor of South Carolina
Governor of South Carolina
List of governors of South Carolina

References

External links
List of Lieutenant Governors for South Carolina
 Office of the Lieutenant Governor for South Carolina
A New Nation Votes: American Election Returns 1787-1825

Lieutenant Governors of South Carolina
Lieutenant Governors
South Carolina